Iman Sadeghi (born 9 January 1992) is an Iranian professional football goalkeeper who currently playing for Malavan F.C. in the Persian Gulf Pro League.

Career

Steel Azin
Sadeghi played for Esteghlal before moving to Steel Azin in the summer of 2010.

Persepolis
On 26 July 2015 Sadeghi joined Persian Gulf Pro League club Persepolis on a three-year contract.

Khooneh be Khooneh
On 19 January 2016, Khooneh be Khooneh signed Sadeghi with a fee of 59,000 euros.

Club career statistics

International
Sadeghi Represented Iran at the 2009 FIFA U-17 World Cup in Nigeria.

References

External sources

 Profile at Persianleague 

Living people
1992 births
Iranian footballers
Persian Gulf Pro League players
Esteghlal F.C. players
Steel Azin F.C. players
Malavan players
Iran under-20 international footballers
Association football goalkeepers
Sportspeople from Tehran